Heinrich Ziegler (31 August 1891 – 3 December 1918) was a German fencer. He competed in the individual foil and team épée events at the 1912 Summer Olympics. He was killed in action during World War I.

See also
 List of Olympians killed in World War I

References

External links
 

1891 births
1918 deaths
German male fencers
Olympic fencers of Germany
Fencers at the 1912 Summer Olympics
German military personnel killed in World War I